Glenflorrie Station, also known as Glen Florrie Station, is a pastoral lease that operates as a cattle station.

It is currently owned by Murray and Aticia Grey. The Grey family have been producing Brahman cattle for the live export trade.

The property is watered by Glenflorrie Creek. It lies between the Ashburton and Henry Rivers, and shares boundaries with Uaroo Station. The traditional owners of the area are the Tharrkari people, who currently lease and manage Ullawarra Station.

Glenflorrie was established at some time prior to 1894. In 1896 the property was running both sheep and cattle. The property was acquired by G. W. Hall at some time prior to 1900. Hall placed the property up for auction in 1919.

The Higham brothers sold Glenflorrie to the Greenway brothers in 1937.

In 1952 the original homestead was gutted by fire. The new homestead that was being built adjoining the old one was not damaged. At this time the owner of the property was Ron Greenway.

The land use agreement allows the Thudgari access to their traditional lands to hunt, gather and camp.

See also
List of ranches and stations

References

Pilbara
Pastoral leases in Western Australia
Stations (Australian agriculture)